"Fallin' in Love" is a song written by Randy Goodrum and Brent Maher, and recorded by American country music artist Sylvia.  It was released in January 1985 as the first single from her album One Step Closer.  The song reached #2 on the Billboard Hot Country Singles chart in May 1985 and #1 on the RPM Country Tracks chart in Canada.

Chart performance

References

1985 singles
1985 songs
Sylvia (singer) songs
Songs written by Randy Goodrum
RCA Records singles
Songs written by Brent Maher
Song recordings produced by Brent Maher